Tyler Anthony Ervin (born October 7, 1993) is a former American football running back and return specialist. He played college football at San Jose State.

Early life
Ervin was born in San Bernardino, California. He attended Colton High School, where he played high school football.

College career
A two-star recruit, Ervin attracted two offers from Idaho and San Jose State. On January 16, 2011, Ervin signed with San José State University.

Ervin began playing for the San Jose State Spartans as a true freshman in 2011 at running back and return specialist. He became the first player to return a kickoff for a touchdown since 2005, when he returned a kickoff 95 yards for a touchdown on November 12 against Utah State. Ervin had 672 return yards and 107 rushing yards.

In the 2012 season, Ervin had 205 rushing and 599 return yards. On September 28, in a 38–34 win over San Diego State, Ervin had a 97-yard kickoff return touchdown. Ervin also caught a 36-yard touchdown reception and returned a kickoff 92 yards for a touchdown on October 20 at UTSA. To cap off an 11–2 season with a year-end #24 ranking in the AP Poll, Ervin had 49 receiving yards and 38 return yards in the Spartans' win over Bowling Green in the 2012 Military Bowl.

Ervin took a medical redshirt year in 2013 after suffering an injury during the season opener against Sacramento State on August 29.

As a redshirt junior in 2014, he had 888 rushing yards, 506 kickoff return yards, and 81 punt return yards. On August 28, Ervin got his first punt return touchdown, a 40-yarder against North Dakota. On September 6, Ervin had a 75-yard touchdown reception against Auburn, tied for the longest passing play against Auburn that year. Ervin also had an 89-yard rushing touchdown in the Spartans' homecoming game win over UNLV on October 4. Sports Illustrated named Ervin to its honorable mention All-America team .

In his redshirt senior season of 2015, Ervin rushed for a single-game school record 300 yards against Fresno State and for 263 yards against New Mexico. In the 2015 Cure Bowl, his final collegiate game, Ervin got his longest career punt return touchdown, for 85 yards in the Spartans' 27–16 win over Georgia State. He finished his senior year with 1,601 rushing yards on 294 carries with 13 touchdowns and 45 receptions for 334 yards with two touchdowns. Along with first-team All-Mountain West Conference, Ervin earned multiple national honors, the Athlon Sports All-American second team and his second straight Sports Illustrated honorable mention All-American title.

Professional career

Houston Texans
Ervin was selected by the Houston Texans in the fourth round (119th overall) of the 2016 NFL Draft. On May 5, 2016, Ervin signed a four-year, $2.9 million contract with Houston. Ervin has been compared to established all-purpose players in the NFL like Jamaal Charles and Darren Sproles. He finished his rookie season with three receptions for 18 receiving yards to go along with return duties.

On October 4, 2017, Ervin was placed on injured reserve after suffering a torn patellar tendon in Week 4. He finished the 2017 season with eight receptions for 38 receiving yards to go along with four carries for 12 rushing yards.

On November 7, 2018, Ervin was waived by the Texans.

Baltimore Ravens
On November 14, 2018, Ervin was signed to the Baltimore Ravens practice squad. He signed a reserve/future contract with the Ravens on January 8, 2019. He was waived on August 31, 2019.

Jacksonville Jaguars
On September 1, 2019, Ervin was claimed off waivers by the Jacksonville Jaguars. He was waived on November 30, 2019.

Green Bay Packers
On December 2, 2019, Ervin was claimed off waivers by the Green Bay Packers. He was re-signed on March 30, 2020. He was placed on injured reserve on December 9, 2020.

NFL career statistics

Regular season

Postseason

References

External links

Green Bay Packers bio
San Jose State Spartans bio

1993 births
Living people
People from Colton, California
Players of American football from California
Sportspeople from San Bernardino County, California
American football running backs
American football return specialists
San Jose State Spartans football players
Houston Texans players
Baltimore Ravens players
Jacksonville Jaguars players
Green Bay Packers players